Hatano (written: 波多野, 羽多野, 秦野 or 畑野) is a Japanese surname. Notable people with the surname include:

, Japanese politician
, Japanese footballer
, Japanese daimyō
, Japanese model and actress
, Japanese psychologist and writer
, Japanese voice actor
, Japanese mezzo-soprano
, Grand Chamberlain of Japan (1912)
, Japanese philosopher
, Japanese voice actor
, Japanese composer and arranger
, Japanese actress

Japanese-language surnames